Simon Trevor Stead (born 25 April 1982) is a British speedway team manager and former rider.

Career Summary 
Born in Sheffield, Stead started his career at local track Sheffield Tigers before riding for Buxton Hitmen, Peterborough Panthers and Workington Comets. Stead signed for Belle Vue Aces prior to the start of the 2005 season and had three seasons with the club. In those three seasons he progressed from a reserve to a heat leader. For the 2008 season Stead joined the Coventry Bees on loan. 

In 2009 he signed a contract which involved him moving from Coventry to the Swindon Robins. He re-signed with Sheffield Tigers in 2013 with the option of doubling up with King's Lynn Stars, his season was cut short by a broken leg sustained while practising in June, and signed for Sheffield Tigers again in 2014 doubling up with Leicester Lions.

Stead was British Under-21 Champion three times in the years 2001/2002 and 2003 and won the 2006 Elite League Pairs Champion along with then teammate Jason Crump. He also won the Premier League Pairs Championship with Carl Stonehewer in 2003.

Stead was given the wildcard spot for the 2006 British Speedway Grand Prix and scored 3 points from 5 rides. He was also chosen to represent Great Britain in the 2005, 2006, 2007 and 2008 Speedway World Cup.

In 2017, Stead moved in to team management, and won the SGB Championship with Sheffield Tigers. In 2018 he took on the team manager role for both Tigers and Leicester Lions. In September 2019 he was appointed as joint team manager (with Oliver Allen) of the Great Britain speedway team.

Speedway Grand Prix results

See also 
 List of Speedway Grand Prix riders

References 

British speedway riders
English motorcycle racers
1982 births
Living people
Belle Vue Aces riders
Buxton Hitmen riders
Coventry Bees riders
King's Lynn Stars riders
Leicester Lions riders
Peterborough Panthers riders
Sheffield Tigers riders
Swindon Robins riders
Wolverhampton Wolves riders
Workington Comets riders
Polonia Bydgoszcz riders